The IJsselmeer, also known as Lake IJssel in English, is a closed off inland bay in the central Netherlands bordering the provinces of Flevoland, North Holland and Friesland. The river IJssel flows into the IJsselmeer.

History 

Two thousand years ago Pomponius Mela, a Roman geographer, mentioned a complex of lakes at the current location of the IJsselmeer. He called it Lacus Flevo. Over the centuries, the lake banks crumbled away due to flooding and wave action and the lake, now called the Almere, grew considerably. During the 12th and 13th centuries, storm surges and rising sea levels flooded large areas of land between the lake and the North Sea, turning the lake into a bay of the North Sea, called the Zuiderzee. The Zuiderzee continued to be a threat to the Dutch, especially when northwesterly storms funnel North Sea waters towards the English Channel, creating very high tides along the Dutch coast. During the 17th century, Zuiderzee dykes collapsed several times and plans were drawn up to eliminate the threat by draining the bay. Later drainage plans focused on creating fertile farmland, but they never progressed beyond the planning stage. It was only after the flood of 1916 that the legislature approved the Zuiderzee Works, a major hydraulic engineering project that involved building dykes, draining parts of the Zuiderzee and constructing the Afsluitdijk to keep tides and high water out.

In 1932 the Zuiderzee was closed off by the Afsluitdijk, a  dyke connecting Friesland and North Holland on either side of the Zuiderzee. The Zuiderzee was no longer a sea inlet and was renamed IJsselmeer (Lake IJssel). The continuing flow of fresh riverwater soon flushed out the saltwater.

From 1929 till 1967, over half the IJsselmeer was drained, creating  of polders: Wieringermeerpolder, Noordoostpolder, East and South Flevoland.

In 1975, a dyke was built between Enkhuizen and Lelystad as the northern boundary of the Markerwaard, a planned but never realized polder in the IJsselmeer. This dyke, the Houtribdijk or Markerwaarddijk, split the IJsselmeer in two parts. The former southern part of the IJsselmeer is now the hydrologically separate Markermeer. The proposed polderisation of the Markerwaard was abandoned after many of the Dutch population did not want the loss of the traditional seaside (now lakeside) environment and vistas. 

In 1986 three polders in the IJsselmeer constituted the new province of Flevoland, the twelfth province of the Netherlands.

The water of the IJsselmeer is now almost completely fresh, the saline having long since been purged. This altered environment has had an impact upon the fish and plant ecosystems. The change has been beneficial for Dutch boats, many of which are steel, as the fresh water significantly reduces rusting of the hulls, and there is far less build-up of marine growth (such as algae and barnacles below the barges' waterlines). This has the knock-on benefit that barges and yachts in the IJsselmeer need far less antifouling, a coating which is inevitably somewhat toxic to wildlife.

Current use 
Due to considerable amounts of water from the Rhine flowing through its distributary IJssel into the IJsselmeer, the closed off bay functions as a large freshwater reservoir, serving as a source for agriculture and drinking water. Outlet sluices in the Afsluitdijk regulate the water level of the IJsselmeer.

The IJsselmeer is used for transport and fishing. It also offers a number of opportunities for recreational activity, both on the water and on its shores. Due to the shallowness of the IJsselmeer, the Markermeer and the bordering lakes, its cities and fishing villages remained mostly unspoilt and have many historical buildings.

The IJsselmeer is home to the offshore segments of Windpark Noordoostpolder. In the future, Windpark Fryslan will also be built in this bay.

See also 
 Ketelmeer, a small bay between the IJsselmeer and the mouth of the river IJssel.
 IJsseloog, an artificial island in the Ketelmeer, built as a repository for contaminated silt.
 Lake Flevo
 Almere (lake)
 Zuiderzee
 Markermeer

Notes

References

Lakes of the Netherlands
Estuaries of the Netherlands
Zuiderzee Works
Landforms of Flevoland
Landforms of North Holland
Landforms of Friesland
Ramsar sites in the Netherlands